Nelly Andrea Williams (born 16 August 1980) is a Trinidadian former cricketer who played as a right-handed batter. She appeared in 30 One Day Internationals matches for the West Indies between 2003 and 2005. She played domestic cricket for Trinidad and Tobago, as well as spending one season with Lancashire.

References

External links

Cricketfundas an Interview with Nelly Williams

1980 births
Living people
West Indian women cricketers
West Indies women One Day International cricketers
Trinidad and Tobago women cricketers
Lancashire women cricketers